The 2012 Liga Super also known as the Astro Liga Super for sponsorship reasons is the ninth season of the Liga Super, the top-tier professional football league in Malaysia.

The season was held from 10 January and concluded on 14 July 2012.

The Liga Super champions for 2012 was Kelantan.

Teams
A total of fourteen teams will contest the league, including eleven sides from the 2011 season and two promoted teams from the 2011 Liga Premier. Singapore Lions of Singapore will also participate in the 2012 season, replacing Harimau Muda A.

Perlis and Pahang were relegated at the end of the 2011 Liga Super after finishing the season in the bottom two places of the league table.

2011 Liga Premier champions PKNS and runners-up Sarawak secured direct promotion to the Liga Super.

Following an agreement between the Football Association of Singapore and the Football Association of Malaysia, Young Lions, with most of the members of the squad are players from Singapore's national under-23 team, will replace Harimau Muda A, which represent the Malaysian Under-23 national football team. While the Singapore Lions will compete at the Liga Super, Harimau Muda A will take the Young Lions position in the S. League. Young Lions was later replaced by a new team, named LionsXII that will replace the former under-23 football team.

 Felda United
 Johor FC
 Kedah
 Kelantan (2011 Liga Super champions)
 Kuala Lumpur
 Negeri Sembilan
 Perak
 PKNS¹
 Sabah
 Sarawak¹
 Selangor
 LionsXII*
 T-Team
 Terengganu

 – LionsXII (Originally to participate was Young Lions of Singapore and will replace Harimau Muda A as Harimau Muda A will replace Young Lions in the S. League.)

¹ – promoted from Liga Premier

Team summaries

Stadium

Stadium changes

 Selangor home stadium was originally the Shah Alam Stadium, but Selangor changed it into the National Stadium, Bukit Jalil after the Shah Alam stadium was being repaired and renovated.
 The KLFA Stadium was closed down for repairs, meaning both Felda United and Kuala Lumpur were forced to move their home stadiums to the Hang Jebat Stadium which is located in Malacca. The stadium will also be the only venue that will be played at daylight, rather than playing in the night.
 Terengganu had shared stadiums with fellow team neighbours, T-Team since 2011 after the roof collapse of the Sultan Mizan Zainal Abidin Stadium. However, on 19 December 2011, The Terengganu Menteri Besar, Ahmad Said announced that the stadium will undergo repairs and maybe will be usable for Terengganu halfway through the league.

Personnel and sponsoring

Coaching changes

Pre-season

In season

Sponsorship changes

Foreign players

Note:

 Teams participating in AFC Cup 2012, (Kelantan and Terengganu) can employ two extra foreign players, as the AFC allows 4 foreign players, making it a total of four foreign players, but the third and fourth foreign player is only allowed to play for the AFC Cup 2012 Tournament.
 LionsXII will not be permitted to have any foreign players as it is an all Singaporean team.

League table

Results
Fixtures and Results of the Liga Super 2012 season.

Week 1

Week 2

Week 3

Week 4

Week 5

Week 6

Week 7

Week 8

Week 9

Week 10

Week 11

Week 12

Week 13

Week 14

Week 15

Week 16

Week 17

Week 18

Week 19

  1 The venue was changed from Kuala Lumpur FA original venue at Hang Jebat Stadium, Melaka to Kelantan FA venue at Kota Bharu at the request of Kuala Lumpur FA.

Week 20

Week 21

Week 22

  1 The venue was changed from Kuala Lumpur FA original venue at Hang Jebat Stadium, Melaka to Sabah FA venue at Kota Kinabalu at the request of Kuala Lumpur FA.

Week 23

Week 24

  1 The venue was changed from Kuala Lumpur FA original venue at Hang Jebat Stadium, Melaka to Selangor FA venue at Shah Alam at the request of Kuala Lumpur FA.

Week 25

Week 26

  1 The venue was changed from Kuala Lumpur FA original venue at Hang Jebat Stadium, Melaka to Perak FA venue at Ipoh at the request of Kuala Lumpur FA.

Round table

Play-offs

Promotion/Relegation
The play-off matches to determine promotion and relegation will be held at Hang Tuah Stadium and Hang Jebat Stadium, Malacca from 17 to 19 July 2012, as next season Liga Super will be reduced to 12 teams from 14 teams this season. Team that finished 11th in the Liga Super, Sarawak will meet second placed team in Liga Premier, Pahang while team that finished 12th in the Liga Super, Kedah will meet team that finished 13th in the Liga Super, Sabah. The winner of both semi-final match will meet in the final to determine who will stay in the 2013 Liga Super. The winner will stay in the Liga Super; the other 3 teams will be relegated to 2013 Liga Premier.

Semi-final 1

Semi-final 2

Final

Season statistics

Top scorers

Own goals

Hat-tricks

Scoring
First goal of the season: Mohd Raimi Mohd Nor for Felda United against Sabah (10 January 2012)
Last goal of the season: Bobby Gonzales for Sabah against Negeri Sembilan (14 July 2012)
Fastest goal of the season: 33 Seconds – Arthuro Henrique Bernhardt for Johor FC against T-Team (17 March 2012)
First own goal of the season: 41 Minutes – Aiman Syazwan Abdullah of Kuala Lumpur for LionsXII (17 January 2012)
Widest winning margin: 9 goals
LionsXII 9–0 Sabah (16 June 2012)
Highest scoring game: 9 goals
Terengganu 6–3 Sabah (17 March 2012)
LionsXII 9–0 Sabah (16 June 2012)
Most goals scored in a match by a single team: 9 goals
LionsXII 9–0 Sabah (16 June 2012)
Most goals scored in a match by a losing team: 3 goals
Terengganu 6–3 Sabah (17 March 2012)
Widest away winning margin: 4 goals
Kuala Lumpur 0–4 Felda United (13 April 2012)
Sabah 0–4 PKNS (19 June 2012)
Kuala Lumpur 2 – 4 Sabah (30 June 2012) 
Most goals scored by an away team: 4 goals
PKNS 1–4 Sarawak (31 March 2012)
T-Team 1–4 PKNS (6 April 2012)
Kuala Lumpur 0–4 Felda United (13 April 2012)
Sabah 0–4 PKNS (19 June 2012)

Clean sheets
Most clean sheets: 11
Kelantan
Fewest clean sheets: 1
Kuala Lumpur

See also
 List of Liga Super seasons
 2012 Liga Premier
 2012 Liga FAM
 2012 Piala FA

References

External links
 Football Association of Malaysia
 RSSSF.com: Malaysia – List of Champions
 Liga Super results

Malaysia Super League seasons
1
Malaysia
Malaysia